The following is a list of Australian radio station callsigns beginning with the number 1, indicating a radio station in the Australian Capital Territory.

Defunct Callsigns

Radio station callsigns, Australian Capital Territory
 
Radio station callsigns
Radio
Lists of radio stations in Australia